Korolevo is an urban type settlement on the Tisza River in Berehove Raion, Zakarpattia Oblast, Ukraine. Population: .

History 
During the reign of Saint Stephen, King of Hungary, a German settlement existed on the site. A royal hunting lodge was built on the hill, and the town was named for it: Királyháza, its original Hungarian name that was later translated to the Slavic Korolev, literally means "king's house". In the 14th century a stone castle named Nyalab was built on the site of the hunting lodge. In 1672 the castle was destroyed. 

In 1910, the village in Ugocsa County of the  Kingdom of Hungary had 3,167 inhabitants, of whom 2,224 were Hungarians and 932 Ruthenians. In 1918 it joined the then newly formed Czechoslovakia (as part of Subcarpathian Ruthenia). In 1944, close to the end of World War II, it ended up in the Ukrainian SSR, then part of the USSR. In 1947 the village was given the status of an urban type settlement. Since 1991 it has been in independent Ukraine.

References

External links

 Települések - Verbőc (Verbovec) - Nagyszőlősi járás 
 Photos 
 Királyháza anno 
 Szent Ferenc Óvoda 
 Облікова картка на сайті ВР України 

Urban-type settlements in Berehove Raion